Prairie Township is a township in Delaware County, Iowa, USA.  As of the 2000 census, its population was 373.

Geography
Prairie Township covers an area of 35.16 square miles (91.07 square kilometers).

Adjacent townships
 Coffins Grove Township (north)
 Delaware Township (northeast)
 Milo Township (east)
 Hazel Green Township (southeast)
 Adams Township (south)
 Newton Township, Buchanan County (southwest)
 Middlefield Township, Buchanan County (west)

Cemeteries
The township contains one cemetery, Sand Creek.

Major highways
 U.S. Route 20

References
 U.S. Board on Geographic Names (GNIS)
 United States Census Bureau cartographic boundary files

External links
 US-Counties.com
 City-Data.com

Townships in Delaware County, Iowa
Townships in Iowa